Sankardev College, established in 1962, is a general degree college situated in Shillong, Meghalaya. This college is affiliated with the North Eastern Hill University.

Departments

Science
Physics
Mathematics
Chemistry
Statistics
Botany
Zoology

Arts and Commerce
Language
English
History
Education
Economics
Philosophy
Sociology
Political Science

References

External links

Universities and colleges in Meghalaya
Colleges affiliated to North-Eastern Hill University
Educational institutions established in 1962
1962 establishments in Assam